The Battle of Galicia, also known as the Battle of Lemberg, was a major battle between Russia and Austria-Hungary during the early stages of World War I in 1914. In the course of the battle, the Austro-Hungarian armies were severely defeated and forced out of Galicia, while the Russians captured Lemberg and, for approximately nine months, ruled Eastern Galicia until their defeat at Gorlice and Tarnów.

Background 
When war came the Chief of the Austro-Hungarian General Staff Franz Conrad von Hötzendorf planned to launch an offensive into Russian Poland with his northern armies (the 1st and 4th). The Russians would  far outnumber the Central Powers in the east (especially the Austro-Hungarian armies, which were Russia's primary target), Conrad believed that their  best option  was  an early advance into southern Poland where  the  Russians would be concentrating their newly mobilized units.

Conrad knew that his German allies were committed to an offensive in the West to defeat the French in the first ten weeks of the war. Only the German 8th army would be in the East, where they would stand on the defensive in East Prussia. However, their alliance with the French obliged the Russians  to  attack the Germans promptly, so substantial Russian forces would be sent to invade East Prussia. The 1st and 4th Austro-Hungarian Armies would advance into Poland without  direct German support.

On 2 August Grand Duke Nicholas Nikolaevich, a second cousin of Emperor Nicholas II who had made his career in the army, was made Commander-in-Chief.  He had an excellent reputation for training troops, but had never commanded a field army and was staggered by his unexpected elevation. The Russian 3rd, 4th, 5th, and 8th Armies were assigned to Galicia. The Russian war plan called for Nikolai Ivanov, the Russian commander of the Southwest Front, to counter an anticipated Austro-Hungarian offensive thrusting eastward from Lemberg. The 3rd and 8th Armies would mount an offensive into eastern Galicia. The Russians could bring 260 trains a day to their front, compared to the Austro-Hungarian's 152.

Battles 

The Austro-Hungarian 1st Army under Viktor Dankl was moving in the north towards Lublin. Dankl struck and drove back Baron Zaltsa's Russian Fourth Army in what would be known as the Battle of Kraśnik. Dankl's army was able to capture 6,000 prisoners.

To the right of Dankl the Austro-Hungarian 4th Army, aiming at Cholm, drove back the Russian Fifth Army under Pavel Plehve in the Battle of Komarów, capturing 20,000 prisoners and inflicting heavy casualties. However, a planned Austrian enveloping movement around the Russian army failed.

As the Russians were being driven back along the northern front, the Austrian 3rd Army and Army Group Kovess made a simultaneous advance against Ivanov's left wing. Along the southern front, Ivanov had the Russian Third Army under Nikolai Ruzsky and the Russian Eighth Army under Aleksei Brusilov. Brusilov and Ruzsky routed the Austro-Hungarians so thoroughly that even though poor roads necessitated that the Russians halt for two days, the Austrians could not regroup to halt the Russian drive. This attack became known as the Battle of Gnila Lipa.

With the entire 3rd Army and Kovess Group in full retreat, Conrad pulled forces away from the northern front which he believed had been sufficiently defeated. In fact, the Russians north of Lemberg were still a potential threat. Ivanov ordered Plehve's Fifth Army to attack and drove the Austrians back as they began to shift forces to the south in an engagement known as the Battle of Rava Ruska. The Austrian Second Army was quickly recalled from Serbia, but it was too late and the entire Austrian front collapsed in Galicia, and the Russians took control of Lemberg.

Results 

Holger Herwig estimates Austro-Hungarian losses of 100,000 dead, 220,000 wounded and 100,000 captured. According to Prit Buttar, the Austro-Hungarian army lost 324,000 men in Galicia, including 130,000 as prisoners, while the Russians lost 225,000 men, of which 40,000 were captured. Other authors estimate 400,000 Austro-Hungarian losses, or "one-third of the Austro-Hungarian Army's combat effectives", and 250,000 for the Russians.

The Russians had pushed the front 100 miles (160 kilometers) into the Carpathian Mountains, completely surrounded the Austrian fortress of Przemyśl and started a Siege of Przemyśl which lasted for over a hundred days. The battle severely damaged the Austro-Hungarian Army, killed a large portion of its trained officers, and crippled Austria-Hungary. Though the Russians had been utterly crushed at the Battle of Tannenberg, their victory at Lemberg prevented that defeat from fully taking its toll on Russian public opinion.

Order of battle

Russian forces
Russian South-Western front. Commander-in-chief – Nikolai Ivanov, Chief of Staff – Mikhail Alekseyev
 4th Army Commander – Anton von Saltza (replaced by Aleksei Evert after the battle of Krasnik).
 Grenadiers Corps
 XIV. Corps
 XVI. Corps
 5th Army, Commander – Pavel Plehve
 V. Corps
 XVII. Corps
 XIX. Corps
 XXV. Corps
 3rd Army, Commander – Nikolai Ruzsky – Staff officers: Vladimir Dragomirov, Nikolay Dukhonin, Mikhail Bonch-Bruyevich
 IX. Corps
 X. Corps
 XI. Corps
 XXI. Corps
 8th Army, Commander – Aleksei Brusilov – Staff officers Anton Denikin (Quartermaster)
 VII. Corps
 VIII. Corps
 XII. Corps
 XXIV. Corps

Austro-Hungarian forces
 Army group Kummer
 7. Cavalry Division
 Landsturm forces
 1st Army. Commander – Viktor Dankl
 I. Corps (Cracow) – 5 and 46 Infantry Divisions
 V. Corps (Bratislava) – 14., 33. and 37 Infantry Divisions
 X. Corps (Przemysl) – 2., 24. and 45. Infantry Divisions
 12. Infantry Division
 3. Cavalry Division
 9. Cavalry Division
 4th Army. Commander – Moritz von Auffenberg
 II. Corps (Wien) – 4., 13. and 25. Infantry Divisions
 VI. Corps (Kaschau) – 15., 27. and 39. Infantry Divisions
 IX. Corps (Leitmeritz) – 10. and 26. Infantry Divisions
 XVII. Corps (formed on outbreak of war) – 19. Infantry Division
 6. Cavalry Division
 10. Cavalry Division
 3rd Army. Commander – Rudolf Brudermann
 XI. Corps (Lemberg) – 30. Infantry Division
 XIV. Corps (Innsbruck) – 3., 8. and 44. Infantry Division
 23. Infantry Division
 41. Infantry Division
 2. Cavalry Division
 4. Cavalry Division
 Army group Kövess (later part of the 2nd Army))
 III. Corps (Graz) – 6., 28. and 22. Infantry Divisions
 XII. Corps (Hermannstadt) – 16., 35. and 38. Infantry Divisions
 11. Infantry Division
 43. Infantry Division
 20. Infantry Division
 1. Cavalry Division
 5. Cavalry Division
 8. Cavalry Division

References

Bibliography 

 
 
 
 
 Tuchman, Barbara, The Guns of August (1962)
 Tucker, Spencer, The Great War: 1914–18 (1998)
 Nikolai Golovin. Great battle for Galicia 

Kingdom of Galicia and Lodomeria
Lemberg, Battle of
Galicia
Galicia
Galicia
Lemberg 1914
Lemberg 1914
Lemberg, Battle of
History of Lviv
1914 in Poland
1914 in the Russian Empire
1915 in Ukraine
Galicia
Galicia
Ukraine in World War I